Terry Randolph (born July 17, 1955) is a former defensive back who played in the National Football League (NFL). He was drafted by the Green Bay Packers in the eleventh round of the 1977 NFL Draft and played that season with the team.

References

Sportspeople from Brooklyn
Players of American football from New York City
Green Bay Packers players
American football defensive backs
American International Yellow Jackets football players
1955 births
Living people